The dead Internet theory is a theory that asserts that the Internet now consists almost entirely of bot activity and automatically generated content, marginalizing human activity. The date given for this "death" is generally around 2016 or 2017.

In 2012, YouTube removed billions of video views from major record labels, such as Sony and Universal, as a result of discovering that they had used fraudulent services to artificially increase the views of their content. The removal of the inflated views aimed to restore credibility to the platform and improve the accuracy of view counts. The move by YouTube also signaled a change in the way the platform would tackle fake views and bot traffic.

See also 
 Algorithmic curation
 Article spinning
 Chatbot
 Content farm
 Deepfake
 Large language model
 Search engine optimization
 Spambot
 Walled garden (technology)

References 

Conspiracy theories
Disinformation